Fantastic Journey may refer to any of the following:

The Fantastic Journey, a science fiction series from 1977 that lasted 10 episodes.
Fantastic Voyage, a science fiction film from 1966 where a crew and submarine are shrunk to perform delicate brain surgery.
Fantastic Voyage II: Destination Brain, a science fiction novel by Isaac Asimov
The Fantastic Flying Journey, a  novel of Gerald Durrell
Gokujo Parodius, also known as Fantastic Journey, a video game

See also 
 Fantastic Voyage (disambiguation)
Magical Journey, an album by Taiwanese girl group S.H.E.
The Incredible Journey, a novel by Sheila Burnford
Voyages Extraordinaires, a series of science fiction novels of Jules Verne